Alakadalinakkare is a 1984 Indian Malayalam film, directed by Joshiy and produced by Thiruppathi Chettiyar. It is a remake of the 1982 Hindi movie Vidhaata. The film stars Prem Nazir, Madhu, Shobana  and Mammootty in the lead roles. The film has musical score by Gangai Amaran.

Cast

 Madhu as Balu, Das, M. D. (smuggler, Vijaya group)
 Prem Nazir as Yusaph (Friend Of Balu)
 M. G. Soman as Mohan (Customs Officer) Balu's Son
 Mammootty as Anand (Mohan's Son)
 K. P. Ummer as Rajasekhar (Balu's Boss) 
 Shobana as Daisy (Lover of Anand)
 Sumalatha as Mohan's wife
 Jose Prakash as Veerendra Nath (smuggler)
 Govindankutty as Veerendran's Gunda
 Jayaprabha as Amina (Yusaph's wife)
 Prathapachandran as Daisy's father
 Sukumari as Daisy's mother
 KPAC Sunny as Varma (smuggler, Vijaya group)
 Lalu Alex as Padmanabhan (Varma's son) 
 C. I. Paul as John Varghese ((smuggler, Vijaya group)
 Janardanan as Khadar ((smuggler, Vijaya group)
 Jagathy Sreekumar
 Kaduvakulam Antony
 Kunchan
 Silk Smitha as dancer

Soundtrack
The music was composed by Gangai Amaran and the lyrics were written by Mankombu Gopalakrishnan and Poovachal Khader.

References

External links
 

1984 films
1980s Malayalam-language films
Malayalam remakes of Hindi films
Films directed by Joshiy
Films scored by Gangai Amaran